Jonathan Goncalves (born 25 January 1989) is a French professional footballer who plays as a centre-back or midfielder for Annecy.

Career
Goncalves joined Annecy in 1998, and began his senior career playing with their reserves in the Départemental 1, the 9th division of France. Promoted to their first team in 2011, he saw the club rise 5 divisions in his tenure with them. His most recent promotion was to the Ligue 2 for the first time in the club's history after coming in second in the 2021–22 Championnat National, and where he acted as captain for 10 games. On 22 July 2022 at the age of 33, he signed his first professional contract with the club in their first ever season in the Ligue 2. He made his professional debut in a 0–0 Ligue 2 tie with FC Metz on 2 September 2022.

Playing style
A versatile player, Goncalves played as a forward as a youth, before moving back to midfielder and eventually centre-back where played most of his career. At the age of 34 in the Ligue 2 he again switched back to playing in midfield.

Personal life
Born in France, Goncalves is of Portuguese descent.

References

External links
 
 Ligue 2 profile

1989 births
Living people
Sportspeople from Annecy
French footballers
French people of Portuguese descent
FC Annecy players
Ligue 2 players
Championnat National players
Championnat National 2 players
Championnat National 3 players
Division d'Honneur players
Association football defenders
Association football midfielders